is a grouping of sites that relate to the industrialization of Japan in the Meiji period, part of the industrial heritage of Japan. The Tomioka silk mill was constructed in 1872 in Gunma Prefecture, which became a leading centre for sericulture, the rearing of silkworms and production of raw silk. In 2007 the monuments were submitted jointly for inscription on the UNESCO World Heritage List under criteria ii, iv, and v. Ten component sites have been proposed (listed below). Four sites were retained in Tomioka Silk Mill and Related Sites in 2014:
Tomioka Silk Mill
Tajima Yahei Sericulture Farm
Takayama-sha Sericulture School
Arafune Cold Storage

See also

 Economic history of Japan
 The Modern Industrial Heritage Sites in Kyushu and Yamaguchi
 World Heritage Sites in Japan
 Sericulture
 Gunma Insect World
 Wada Ei

References

External links
 UNESCO listing
 Gunma Prefecture site dedicated to the listing
 Proposal document
 Pamphlet

Economic history of Japan
Gunma Prefecture
Silk mills